National Dong Hwa University (NDHU) is a national research university located in Hualien, Taiwan. Established in 1994, NDHU is widely ranked as Top 10% university in Taiwan by THE, QS, U.S. News, which offers sixth widest range of disciplines in Taiwan, including the sciences, engineering, computer science, environmental studies, oceanography, law, arts, design, humanities, anthropology, social sciences, education sciences, music, and business.

NDHU is renowned for its liberal atmosphere, which is organized into eight colleges, 44 academic departments, and 56 graduate institutes, which enrolled about 10,000 undergraduate & graduate students, and over 1,000 international students pursuing degrees and joining exchange programs.

The NDHU Library holds more than two million volumes and is eighth largest academic library in Taiwan. The University's main campus is located in Shoufeng, in the northern half of Hualien County.

History

Foundation 

National Dong Hwa University was established in 1994 in Shoufeng. As the first Taiwan's university founded under the full democratization after the Martial Law and Temporary Provisions Effective During the Period of Communist Rebellion were all lift, NDHU set "Freedom, Democracy, Creativity, Excellence" as its founding spirit to reflect the notable timing of NDHU's establishment.

With Mu Tzung-Tsann, the vice-chancellor of California State University, Los Angeles, as founding president, NDHU attracted many notable Taiwanese scholars from universities in North America to co-found this university, such as Yang Mu, Distinguished Professor of Comparative Literature at University of Washington, Cheng Chih-Ming, Professor of Economics at Georgia Institute of Technology, Zheng Qing Mao, Professor of East Asia Studies at University of California, Berkeley, Kuo Syh-yen, Professor of Electrical & Computer Engineering at University of Arizona, Chiao Chien, Professor of Anthropology at Indiana University Bloomington, Wang Philip, Professor of Recreation & Tourism Management at Kent State University, Wu Tiee-Jian, Professor of Mathematics at University of Houston, and Fu James, Professor of Statistics at University of Manitoba.

In 2000, NDHU establish the first College of Indigenous Studies in Taiwan, which is commonly regarded as most leading institution for Indigenous Studies in Asia.In 2005, NDHU was in academic partnership with the National Museum of Marine Biology and Aquarium (NMMBA), the most notable institution dedicated to public education and research of marine biology in Taiwan, to jointly establish the College of Marine Sciences and Graduate Institute of Marine Biology in Kenting National Park, Checheng, Pingtung.

Prior to the merge with Hua-Shih, NDHU was the first university in Taiwan to offer degrees in Environmental Policy, Recreation & Tourism Management, Sport & Leisure Studies, Natural Resources Management, Ethnic Relations and Cultures, Indigenous Arts, Indigenous Development, Creative Writing, Global Logistics Management.

National Hualien University of Education (1947-2008) 
The National Hualien University of Education (Commonly known as Hua-Shih) was one of Taiwan's oldest normal schools established in 1947 under National Government of the Republic of China in Hualien City as Taiwan Provincial Hualien Normal School (TPHNS) in response to the nation's reconstruction and development after World War II. In 1949, Hua-Shih established Affiliated Primary School of Taiwan Provincial Hualien Normal School to provide a training ground for the School's students, which cultivated the winner of Oscar Best Director, Ang Lee.

Followed the rapidly arising demand for teachers serving for compulsory education purpose, the school was renamed Taiwan Provincial Hualien Junior Teachers' College in 1964, National Hualien Teachers' College in 1987, and granted university status in 2005.

Hua-Shih was Taiwan's first institution to offer MEd and PhD in Multicultural Education, MA and PhD in Folk Literature, as well as one of four institutions in Taiwan to offer MS and PhD in Science Education.

Prior to the merge with NDHU, Hua-Shih has cultivated many notable alumni, including Tsai Ping-kun, Principal of Jianguo High School and Taichung First Senior High School, Tang Chih-Min, Founding Principal of Affiliated Senior High School of National Chengchi University and Director of Department of Education of Taipei City Government, and Chang Ming-Wen ,Director of Department of Education of New Taipei City Government.

National Dong Hwa University 
In 2008, with 2.5 billion support from Ministry of Education, National Dong Hwa University merged with the National Hualien University of Education into the university with 5th widest range of disciplines in Taiwan, and renamed the newly integrated College of Education into Hua-Shih College of Education in memory of sixty-year dedication of education by National Hualien University of Education.

Meanwhile, NDHU established College of The Arts as the first art school in Eastern Taiwan and College of Environmental Studies as the first college in Taiwan dedicated to sustainability and environmental management in interdisciplinary approach. In 2014, Maw-Kuen Wu took over as NDHU's 3th president, who is the International Fellow of National Academy of Sciences and Distinguish Professor of Applied Physic at Columbia University. During his presidency, Sunflower Student Movement was happened, Wu publicly support the activist by announcing "As the president of NDHU, I greatly admire students who not only focus on their studies, but also care about current events and express their positions. This is the concrete implementation of democratic and free education, as well as a positive force to promote the advancement of the country. Therefore, I have great respect for student protests. However, I also hope that students can maintain a rational attitude in communication and pay attention to their own safety.". In 2018, Chao Han-Chieh took over the 4th president of NDHU, who is the Fellow of Institution of Engineering and Technology (IET) and Fellow of British Computer Society (BCS).

In 2020 anniversary day, NDHU signs the first "Commitment to Sustainable Development Goals" among Universities in Taiwan to announce it's determination to sustainable world.

The fully integrated NDHU consolidated its reputation in many disciplines and prestige in Eastern Taiwan, and reflected in its rankings and other accolades.

Campuses 
National Dong Hwa University's three campuses are known for their natural settings.

Shoufeng 
NDHU's main campus, Shoufeng Campus, is situated in rural town of Shoufeng, Hualien.

NDHU's  campus is Taiwan's largest flat land university campus, which was designed in postmodern style by Charles Moore, the dean of Yale School of Architecture.

The Shoufeng campus is renowned for its distinctive architecture and natural setting. The academic area are on the center of the campus, containing library, art museum, concert hall, arts workshop, and academic & research buildings. The NDHU Concert Hall within the College of The Arts is the largest performing arts hall in Eastern Taiwan.

The two dormitory communities are adjacent to academic area, one is on the east, the another is on the west. The Athletic facilities surrounds academic area, including stadium, swimming pools, athletic field, baseball field, basketball court, tennis court, volleyball court, kayak, and facilities for Project Adventure.

In 2016, NDHU runs solar university project, constructing the first batch of rooftop photovoltaic solar panels. As of 2021, the solar energy covers 40% of NDHU's annual electric usage, which is the best ever performance achieved by any university in Taiwan.

Meilun 

The Meilun campus was the main campus of National Hualien University of Education before it was merged with NDHU. The  campus is located in Hualien City's Meilun district near the Qixingtan Beach on the Pacific Ocean. In 2020, NDHU collaborated with Lee Yuen-Cheng, founder of Boston International Experimental Education Institution and an alumnus of NDHU, to establish the first international school within the campus, namely Hualien International School.

Pingtung 

NDHU's Graduate Institute of Marine Biology is based at the National Museum of Marine Biology and Aquarium (NMMBA) in Chechung Township in Pingtung County, standing in Kenting National Park and facing the Taiwan Strait in the west. The National Museum of Marine Biology and Aquarium is a well-known marine museum for academic research and marine education in Taiwan.

Organization and administration 
NDHU serves over 10,000 students and confers undergraduate, master's and doctoral degrees in a comprehensive range of fields. The university is organized from its 39 departments and 56 graduate institutes into 8 colleges and over 70 research centers.

Governance

University Officials 
NDHU's supreme official is president, which is responsible for the overall operation of the university in a chief executive role. The president of NDHU is elected for a term not normally exceeding eight years by representatives from university, student, alumni, society. The president of NDHU appoints one to three vice-presidents and deans of administrative offices, including Office of Academic Affairs (OAA), Office of Research and Development (ORD), Office of International Affairs (OIA), Office of Student Affairs (OSA), and Office of General Affairs (OGA).

The deans of college are elected for a term not normally exceeding 6 years, which are responsible for administration of the college-level affairs. The NDHU's College is governed by College Council, composed of the dean, the associate dean, heads of departments and graduate institutes, and current students.

University Council 
NDHU's governing body is the university council, which oversees the academic policy and management of NDHU and the conduct of its affairs, and approves NDHU's long-term plans. It consists of president, vice-presidents, deans, heads of department, and current students. The university council was established to ensure that every aspects of the university have a continuing voice in the management of NDHU.

Academic organizations 
NDHU is organized into seven academic colleges and one undergraduate college: College of Humanities and Social Sciences (CHASS), College of Science and Engineering (CSAE), School of Management (CMGT), Hua-Shih College of Education (HSCE), College of The Arts (ARTS), College of Indigenous Studies (CIS), College of Environmental Studies and Oceanography (CESO), and College of Huilan (CHL).

Within these colleges are "departments" and "graduate institutes", which either represent one academic discipline such as Computer Science, or assemble adjacent academic disciplines such as the Department of Tourism, Recreation, and Leisure Studies.

College of Humanities and Social Sciences 

NDHU's College of Humanities and Social Sciences (CHASS) was founded by Yang Mu, Professor Emeritus at University of Washington and Founding Dean at Hong Kong University of Science and Technology. CHASS supports interdisciplinary academic training and research in the fields including law, economics, history, sociology, psychology, Taiwan and regional studies, public administration, creative writing, sinophone literature, Chinese language and literature, English literature, TESOL.

NDHU's M.F.A. in Creative Writing was the first and most recognized MFA program in Chinese-speaking world, which had cultivated many emerging outstanding literary talents in Taiwan.

The College offers four PhD programs, Ph.D. in Teaching Chinese as a Second Language (TCASL), Ph.D. in Asia-Pacific Regional Studies (APRS), Ph.D. in Economics, and Ph.D. in Chinese Literature, and has over 10 research centers. The European Union Research Centre (EURC) is funded by European Union (EU) and one of the seven university centers allied with the European Union Center in Taiwan (EUTW) to facilitate European Studies and academic exchange between Eastern Taiwan and European Union.

College of Science and Engineering 

The College of Science and Engineering (CSAE) is founded by Hsia Yu-Ping, Chair Professor at California Institute of Technology and Yale University, as the two largest of 8 colleges within NDHU.

NDHU CSAE has 8 departments: Applied Mathematics (AM), Physics (PHYS), Life Science (LS), Chemistry (CHEM), Electrical Engineering (EE), Computer Science and Information Engineering (CSIE), Materials Science and Engineering (MSE), Opto-Electronic Engineering (OEE). The College provides more than 40 degree programs at the bachelor's, master's and doctoral levels.

In 2021, Times Higher Education World University Rankings by Subject ranked NDHU No.5 in Computer Sciences, No.8 in Engineering, and No.8 in Physical Sciences in Taiwan, the best ever position achieved by any university in Eastern Taiwan.
ARWU Global Ranking of Academic Subjects ranked NDHU No.4 in Electrical & Electronic Engineering in Taiwan, which was only next to National Taiwan University (NTU), National Yang Ming Chiao Tung University (NYCU), and National Tsing Hua University (NTHU).

School of Management 

NDHU School of Management was founded as Graduate Institute of Business Administration in 1994. It has six academic departments and a graduate institute: Business Administration, International Business, Finance, Accounting, Information Management, Logistics Management, Tourism, Recreation, and Leisure Studies (TRLS). The College offers degree programs– undergraduate, MBA, MIM, EMBA, MSc, PhD, and dual degree with oversea partner universities.

In 2021, ARWU Global Ranking of Academic Subjects ranked NDHU School of Management 101-150th in the world for Hospitality & Tourism Management, holding the same statue with Indiana University Bloomington, University of Illinois at Urbana-Champaign, and University of Ottawa.

Hua-Shih College of Education 
Hua-Shih College of Education (Hua-Shih) traces its roots back to Taiwan Provincial Hualien Normal School established in 1947, as one of nine exclusive schools dedicated to early childhood and primary education in contemporary Taiwan. Hua-Shih was the first institution in Taiwan to offer MEd and PhD in Multicultural Education, which was the most recognized program in Taiwan. The College become one of eight colleges at NDHU in 2008. Nowadays, Hua-Shih offers over 20 programs- BEd, MEd, MSc, PhD in Curriculum and Instruction, Early Childhood Education, Educational Administration, Special Education, Physical Education and Kinesiology, Multicultural Education, and Science Education.

College of The Arts 

The College of The Arts (ARTS) is the first art school to be established in Eastern Taiwan, which is organized into three departments — Music, Arts and Design, Arts and Creative Industry.

The College offers seven programs — B.M., B.A., B.F.A., M.M., M.A., M.F.A., into Creative Design, Studio Art, Indigenous Art, Visual Art Education, Creative Industry Management, Music Performance, Music Education.

College of Indigenous Studies 

The College of Indigenous Studies (CIS) was first in Taiwan and most renowned institution for Indigenous Studies in Asia. Established in 2001, NDHU CIS traced its roots back to Graduate Institute of Ethnic Relations and Cultures in 1995, which was founded by Chiao Chien, Professor of Anthropology at Indiana University Bloomington and Founding Chair of Anthropology at Chinese University of Hong Kong.

NDHU CIS was the first institution in Taiwan to grant degree in Ethnic Relations and Cultures (ERC), Indigenous Arts, Indigenous Development, Indigenous Affair, Indigenous Social Work (ISW), and Indigenous Language and Communication (ILC), which offering over 10 programs- B.A., B.S.S., B.S.W., B.I.A., M.S.S, M.S.W. Ph.D. in these disciplines. The International Ph.D. in Indigenous Studies was establish in 2023 for oversea students who seek to discover knowledge and culture of Taiwanese indigenous peoples.

College of Environmental Studies and Oceanography 

The College of Environmental Studies and Oceanography (CESO) was established in 2022 through the merger of College of Environmental Studies (CES) and College of Marine Sciences (CMS) to serve purpose of interdisciplinary trends of sustainability studies. The College of Environmental Studies (CES) was established in 2009 by merging five graduate institutes — Natural Resources and Management, Environmental Policy, Ecological and Environmental Education, Earth Science, and Biological Resources and Technology into a school of Environmental Studies. The College of Marine Sciences formerly was a graduate school at NDHU that was founded in 2005 as an academic collaboration with National Museum of Marine Biology and Aquarium (NMMBA) in Kenting National Park, which set the first record on academic collaboration between higher education and museum in Taiwan.

NDHU CESO emphasize on interdisciplinary collaborative approach in solving environmental and marine issues with its two department and graduate institute — Department of Natural Resources and Environmental Studies (NRES) and Graduate Institute of Marine Biology (IMB), and five research centers  – Center for Interdisciplinary Research on Ecology and Sustainability (CIRES), Center for Disaster Prevention Research (CDPR), Environmental Education Center (EEC), Campus Center for the Environment (CCE), and Eastern Taiwan Earthquake Research Center (ETERC).

The College offers seven programs — BSc, MSc, PhD in Natural Resources and Environmental Studies (NRES), MSc in Marine Biotechnology, MSc in Marine Biodiversity and Evolutionary Biology, and PhD in Marine Biology. NDHU CESO with College of Humanities and Social Sciences (CHASS) and College of Indigenous Studies (CIS) to offer MSc program in Humanity and Environmental Science (HES), the first in Taiwan.

Academics

Teaching and learning 
NDHU is a highly residential research university offering over 40 undergraduate majors and over 70 graduate degrees.
The four-year, full-time undergraduate program runs a modular curricula with low barrier for double major and minor.

In 2022, NDHU School of Management and NDHU College of Science and Engineering were selected as "Key Bilingual College" (雙語重點學院) in "Program of Bilingual Education for Students in College" (大學雙語學習計畫) by Ministry of Education (MOE) to facilitate international learning and teaching.

For 2022-year graduates, more than 40% and 20% of students obtained minor and double major degrees respectively, making it the second-highest and forth-highest university in Taiwan. In 2018, NDHU ran a learning community program, students can form interdisciplinary project-based learning communities with support of scholarship.

Research 
NDHU is ranked 7th greatest research impact university in Taiwan in CNCI Index, the evaluation undertaken by Ministry of Education (MOE). NDHU is ranked 5th most innovative academic institution in Taiwan and 332th in the world by SCImago Journal Rank.

NDHU is ranked largest research impact in Computer Science (No.1 Citations in Taiwan, 149th in the world) and Engineering (No.3 Citations in Taiwan) by Times Higher Education World University Ranking.

The University Ranking by Academic Performance ranked NDHU No.1 research impact in Taiwan for Information & Computer Science. The Academic Ranking of World Universities ranked NDHU No.5 in Taiwan for Electrical & Electronic Engineering (401–500 in the World) and No.5 in Taiwan for Hospitality & Tourism Management (101–150 in the World).

NDHU's master's program in Ethnic Relations and Cultures was selected as a Fulbright Program, which is funded by U.S. government.

Admission 
Admission to the undergraduate program, Rift Valley Interdisciplinary Shuyuen (縱谷跨域書院), is one of the most selective undergraduate programs in Taiwan. For the Fall 2021 program students, NDHU only accepted of 7.1% applicants.

Partnerships

Global Universities 
NDHU has academic partnerships in teaching and research with more than 460 universities across the Americas, Asia, Oceania, Europe, Middle East and Africa, including University of Edinburgh in Edinburgh, University of Nottingham in Nottingham, Uppsala University in Gotland, University of California, San Diego in San Diego, Purdue University in West Lafayette, Freie Universitaet Berlin in Berlin, University of Mannheim in Mannheim, University of New South Wales in Sydney, Tokyo Institute of Technology in Tokyo, Tohoku University in Sendai, Hokkaido University in Sapporo, Peking University in Beijing, and Fudan University in Shanghai.

Mandarin Education 

NDHU is one of greatest impact institutions in Mandarin education. The University is selected as first round of 10 Mandarin Education Centers in "Taiwan Huayu BEST Program" by Ministry of Foreign Affairs (MOFA) and Ministry of Education (MOE) to jointly promote international cooperation program in Mandarin Education in United States and Europe. The university runs two oversea Chinese Language Centers at Howard University and Oakland University in the United States to bring Taiwanese Mandarin education to the partner universities. NDHU is also selected one of nine universities in "Taiwan-Europe Connectivity Scholarship" by MOFA to expand academic cooperation and Mandarin education with European universities and selected one of five universities in "Africa Elite Talent Cultivation Program" with National Taiwan University, National Taiwan Normal University by MOE to expand Taiwan's academic impact and Mandarin education to African.

Research Institutes 
NDHU further establishes academic partnerships with global research institutes, including Academia Sinica, National Museum of Marine Biology and Aquarium, National Academy of Marine Research, National Center for Research on Earthquake Engineering, Central Geological Survey, Central Weather Bureau, European Union Centre in Taiwan, Defence Institute of Advanced Technology in India, Polish Academy of Sciences in Poland, Shanghai Academy of Social Sciences in China.

Rankings and reputation

University Rankings 
Top 5 Most Innovative University in Taiwan by SCImago
NDHU is ranked No.5 in Taiwan and 332th in the world in Innovation Ranking by SCImago Journal Rank.

Top 5 High Potential University in Taiwan by THE Young University Ranking
In 2021, NDHU is awarded as Top 5 high potential University in Taiwan and 251–300th in the world by Times Higher Education Young University Rankings.

Top 10 Universities in Taiwan by THE World University Ranking
In 2020, NDHU is ranked No.10 in Taiwan by Times Higher Education World University Rankings. In terms of Research Citation and International Outlook, NDHU is ranked No.9 and No.7 in Taiwan by 2021 Times Higher Education World University Rankings.

Top 7 National University in Taiwan
NDHU was elected 7th of public university in "Top 10 Public Universities " published by Global Views Monthly (GVM; 遠見雜誌), which is Evaluated by all presidents of higher education in Taiwan.

Notable people

Alumni 
Less than 30 years, NDHU alumni have contributed creatively and significantly to society, the arts and sciences, business, and national and international affairs.
T.H. Tung (Honorary PhD), incumbent chairperson of Pegatron, co-founder of ASUS Computer Inc. and its former vice chairman.
Yoga Lin (BA), famous Taiwan Pop Music Singer
Gan Yao-ming (MFA), famous Taiwan novel and essay writer
Fu Kun-chi (MPA), Legislator and former Magistrate of Hualien County.
Tsai Ping-kun (AA), Deputy Mayor of Taipei, former Deputy Mayor of Taichung, Deputy Minister of Culture in Taiwan, and Principal of Taipei Municipal Jianguo High School and Taichung Municipal Taichung First Senior High School.
Tang Chih-Min (AA), Founding Principal of Affiliated Senior High School of National Chengchi University, Distinguished Professor of Graduate Institute of Administration and Policy at National Chengchi University, Director of Department of Education at Taipei City Government.
Wu Wu-Hsiung (AA), 13th Principal of Taipei Municipal Jianguo High School, the 1st high school in Taiwan.
Chang Ming-Wen (MEd), Director of Department of Education, New Taipei City Government
Lin Da-kuei (MSc), Vice President & Partner at KPMG Cybersecurity in Taiwan.
Lin Li-yu (MBA), Founder of Chatime, the world's leading teahouse.
Wang Ching-chi (MBA), President at Château Hotels & Resorts, former president of Farglory Hotel.
Chen Sao-liang (MBA), President at Taiwan International Ports Corporation.
Liu Wei-zhi (BS), Direct of the Board at Advantech.
Wang Chia-ching (MA), Vice President at Google Inc. in Taiwan.
Ben Tsai (MA), Vice President at Cathay Venture.
Lin Allen (BS), Associate Vice President at Foxconn.
Wang Cheng-pang (AA), the member of Chinese Taipei's silver medal men's archery team at 2004 Summer Olympics.

Faculty

See also 
List of universities in Taiwan
EUTW university alliance

Notes

References

External links 
 

 
Universities and colleges in Taiwan
Universities and colleges in Hualien County
Universities and colleges in Pingtung County
Educational institutions established in 1994
Hualien City
1994 establishments in Taiwan